Kudargarh is a famous Hindu pilgrim centre situated in Surajpur District of the state of Chhattisgarh in India. It is 40 km from district headquarters of  Surajpur connected by an all-weather road. The best time to visit is during Chaitra Navaratra (in the month of April).
It is located on a hillock with approximately 800 steps. A very panoramic view from top on addition to the DARSHAN of deity.

Temple
The Maa Bagheshwari Devi Temple is dedicated to Goddess Kudargarhi who is perched on top of a hill and is the  major attraction in Kudargarh.

The history of the temple is obscure. According to Dalton, the temple was built by Suryavanshi Khairwar Baland Rajput Kings. Balands were the original rulers of Korea state in the 17th century.

Also Devotees throng this temple to appease the goddess for the fulfillment of their desires. On fulfillment of their wish, the Goddess is offered with the blood of a goat which is poured into a small hole (kund) of 6 inch in diameter. It is said that the kund would not get filled up even if thousands of goat's blood is poured into it, in which blood goat in honour of devi is given, a fact is that it never overflows.

References

External links 

 

Hindu temples in Chhattisgarh
Shakti temples